Víctor Álvarez may refer to:

 Víctor Álvarez (baseball) (born 1976), Major League Baseball pitcher
 Víctor Álvarez (footballer) (born 1993), Spanish footballer